The 1997 BYU Cougars football team represented Brigham Young University in the 1997 NCAA Division I-A football season.

Schedule

Roster

References

BYU
BYU Cougars football seasons
BYU Cougars football